White Spur is the southern wall of the Allegro Valley, in the Usarp Mountains of Victoria Land, Antarctica.

It was named by US-ACAN for Russell F. White, USARP meteorologist who worked at the South Pole Station between 1967 and 1968.

References

 

Oates Land